Lemierzyce  (formerly German Alt Limmritz) is a village in the administrative district of Gmina Słońsk, within Sulęcin County, Lubusz Voivodeship, in western Poland.

The village has a population of 630.

References

Lemierzyce